Matveyevskaya is a rural locality (a village) in Mishutinskoye Rural Settlement, Vozhegodsky District, Vologda Oblast, Russia. The population was 11 as of 2002.

Geography 
Matveyevskaya is located 69 km east of Vozhega (the district's administrative centre) by road. Ivoninskaya is the nearest rural locality.

References 

Rural localities in Vozhegodsky District